Posey Township is one of thirteen townships in Franklin County, Indiana. As of the 2010 census, its population was 1,051.

History
Posey Township is named for Thomas Posey, second Governor of Indiana Territory.

Geography

Unincorporated towns
 Andersonville
 Buena Vista
 Lake View
(This list is based on USGS data and may include former settlements.)

Adjacent townships
 Orange Township, Fayette County (north)
 Columbia Township, Fayette County (northeast)
 Laurel Township (east)
 Salt Creek Township (southeast)
 Fugit Township, Decatur County (southwest)
 Richland Township, Rush County (west)
 Noble Township, Rush County (northwest)

Major highways
 U.S. Route 52
 Indiana State Road 244

Cemeteries
The township contains four cemeteries: Old Brick, Old Brick, Young Brick and Middle Brick.

Education
Posey Township residents may obtain a free library card from the Franklin County Public Library District in Brookville.

References
 United States Census Bureau cartographic boundary files
 U.S. Board on Geographic Names

External links
 Indiana Township Association
 United Township Association of Indiana

Townships in Franklin County, Indiana
Townships in Indiana